Hot Shots II is the second studio album by the Scottish musical group The Beta Band, released on 16 July 2001. Colin "C-Swing" Emmanuel and the band co-produced the album. The band's previous work had used dense experimentation but Hot Shots II had a minimal style influenced by R&B, hip hop and electronica.

Critical reception

Pitchfork placed Hot Shots II at number 118 on its list of top 200 albums of the 2000s. The album is also included in the 2010 edition of 1001 Albums You Must Hear Before You Die. Kludge ranked it at number 1 on its list of top 10 albums of 2001.

Track listing

Charts

Release history

References

External links
 
 

2001 albums
The Beta Band albums
Astralwerks albums
Regal Zonophone Records albums